Russian legislative elections determine the composition of the State Duma, the lower house of the Russian parliament, for the next five years. 

According to the current Russian legislation, 225 from the 450 mandates of the State Duma are distributed among the lists of political parties that received more than 5% of the votes. The other 225 are the winners of elections in single-mandate constituencies.
The elections of 1993–2003 and 2016–2021 were held according to this scheme. In 2007 and 2011, the threshold was 7% and all 450 members of the Duma were elected by party lists.

Next legislative election 
 2026 Russian legislative election

See also 
 Elections in Russia

References